James Lewis Heft is an American theologian currently the Alton M. Brooks Professor of Religion at University of Southern California.

References

Year of birth missing (living people)
Living people
University of Southern California faculty
American theologians
University of Toronto alumni
Place of birth missing (living people)